The Miss Gambia is a national beauty pageant in The Gambia. The pageant aims to be a cultural ambassador of The Gambia.

History
The Miss Gambia beauty pageants aims to be the platform of young women in Gambia as ambassador of goodwill for the country. In 1964 the pageant organized and patronized by Gambians. In 2001 the annual Miss Gambia had not been organized due to myriad reasons including financial, organizational and logistical problems. Miss Gambia winners also had experience in Miss Universe or Miss World history.

In 2022 the new organization under Ida Saine Conteh took over the Miss Gambia beauty pageant. The main plan for a new era is to return at Miss Universe competition.

Organizers
1963 — Roxy Vous (Miss Bathurst)
1965 — METTA Youth Club (Miss Independence)
1981 — Atta Promotion
2022 — Ida Saine Conteh (The Gambia Fashion Organisation)

Titleholders

Titleholders under Miss Gambia org.

Miss Universe Gambia

References 

 

Gambia 
Recurring events established in 1965
Government-owned beauty pageants
Gambian culture